The Weeknd Asia Tour was the sixth concert tour by Canadian singer the Weeknd, in support of his first extended play My Dear Melancholy and his first greatest hits album The Weeknd in Japan.  The tour began on November 30, 2018, in Hong Kong and concluded on December 18, 2018, at Makuhari Messe in Chiba, Japan. It was the Weeknd's first tour in Asia and it featured a guest appearance from Kenshi Yonezu at the concert in Japan.

Set list
This set list is representative of the typical set of each concert. It is not intended to be representative of all concerts for the duration of the tour.

 "Pray for Me"
 "Starboy"
 "Party Monster"
 "Reminder"
 "Six Feet Under"
 "Low Life" 
 "Might Not"
 "Sidewalks"
 "Crew Love"
 "House of Balloons / Glass Table Girls"
 "Belong to the World"
 "Pretty"
 "Secrets"
 "Can't Feel My Face"
 "In the Night"
 "I Feel It Coming"
 "The Morning"
 "Wicked Games"
 "Earned It"
 "Or Nah"
 "Often"
 "Acquainted"
 "Wasted Times"
 "Call Out My Name"
 "The Hills"

Tour dates

Cancelled shows

Notes

References

2018 concert tours
The Weeknd concert tours
Concert tours of Asia